is a Japanese singer and songwriter who is affiliated with KADOKAWA. She made her major debut in 2018 with the song , which was used as the opening theme to the anime series Bloom Into You. Her music has also been featured in Re:Zero − Starting Life in Another World, Boogiepop and Others, Astra Lost in Space, Cautious Hero: The Hero Is Overpowered but Overly Cautious, Isekai Quartet, So I'm a Spider, So What?, Osamake: Romcom Where The Childhood Friend Won't Lose, Police in a Pod, Trapped in a Dating Sim: The World of Otome Games Is Tough for Mobs and Made in Abyss. She officially announced her debut as a voice actress on April 1, 2022. She signed a contract with EARLY WING agency.

Career
Azuna was born on December 3, 1993. She had an interest in music and performing since her youth, and she participated in musicals from her second year of elementary to her third year of high school. While performing in musicals, she engaged in singing, dancing, and acting, but enjoyed singing the most out of the three. Because of this, she decided to focus on singing, and upon entering university, she began performing at various live venues in Tokyo.

Azuna's professional music career began after she first learned of an audition to perform a song for the anime television series Bloom Into You. At the time, she only knew that the series was about love between two girls, and only read the original manga series later. She passed the audition, and the resulting song , which was used as the series' opening theme song, was released as her 1st single on November 28, 2018. She also performed the song "Memories", which was used as an insert song in the original video animation Re:Zero − Starting Life in Another World: Memory Snow. Her 2nd single "Whiteout" was released on February 27, 2019; the title track was used as the ending theme song to the anime series Boogiepop and Others. Her 3rd single "Glow at the Velocity of Light" was released on August 21, 2019; the title track was used as the ending theme song to the anime series Astra Lost in Space. Her 4th single "be perfect, plz!" was released on November 6, 2019; the title track was used as the ending theme song to the anime series Cautious Hero: The Hero Is Overpowered but Overly Cautious. Her 5th single "keep weaving your spider away" was released on January 27, 2021; the title track was used as the first opening theme song to the anime series So I'm a Spider, So What?. Her 6th single "Chance! & Revenge!" was released on April 28, 2021; the title track was used as the opening theme song to the anime series Osamake: Romcom Where The Childhood Friend Won't Lose. Her 7th single  was released on January 26, 2022; the title track was used as the opening theme song to the anime series Police in a Pod. Her 8th single "selfish" was released on May 11, 2022; the title track was used as the ending theme song to the anime series Trapped in a Dating Sim: The World of Otome Games Is Tough for Mobs. Her 9th single  was released on August 24, 2022; the title track was used as the opening theme song to the anime series Made in Abyss: The Golden City of the Scorching Sun, while its coupling track  was used as the ending theme song to the video game Made in Abyss: Binary Star Falling into Darkness.

Discography

Singles

Other appearances

References

External links
Official website 

1993 births
Living people
Japanese women pop singers
Japanese women singer-songwriters
Japanese singer-songwriters
Anime singers